Kuhn's-Big K, (typically signed as simply Big K) was a large discount store chain in the Southeastern United States that merged with Walmart in 1981 The store is entirely unrelated to, and preceded, Big Kmart

History 
Kuhn's-Big K began in 1913, as a chain of variety stores called Kuhn Brothers, founded in Columbia, Tennessee. The first Kuhn's-Big K was opened in 1962, and by 1969 operated 35 variety stores and 18 Big K discount department stores. That same year, the company was officially renamed to Kuhn's - Big K Stores Corporation. In March 1970, the company announced plans to go public with 400,000 shares, then operating 21 Big K stores and 34 Kuhn's Variety Stores. The company later went public in April 1971, with 512,000 shares of common stock.

Kuhn's Big K began an expansion push in the early 1970s, and by August 1971 had a total of 17 stores in varying stages of development. The company at this time began to open larger and larger stores, the biggest at the time being a planned 76,000 sq ft location in Nashville, Tennessee. The company had a total of 30 Big K stores and 32 Kuhn's Variety Stores, when they bought out the lease of a Sky City store in Greeneville, Tennessee in January 1972. Big K expanded into South Carolina with the purchase of competing discount chain Edward's in September 1977, adding 33 stores, operated as subsidiary Big K-Edwards, to the then 105 stores.

In June 1981, Kuhn's-Big K, then described as "financially struggling" by The New York Times, agreed to a merger with competitor Walmart in a deal valued at $13 million. The merger followed another attempted merger with Walmart in 1980, which collapsed due to store lease complications.

References

External links
 exterior picture of store
 exterior picture of store
 Wal-Mart's official timeline mentioning the merger

Defunct discount stores of the United States
Companies based in Nashville, Tennessee
Retail companies established in 1962
Retail companies disestablished in 1980
Walmart